Bestemsu Özdemir (born 20 April 1992) is a Turkish actress.

Early life
Bestemsu Özdemir was born on 20 April 1992 in Istanbul, Turkey. She completed her education in Istanbul Technical University at the department of Fashion Design. The actress started modelling during her high school years. Özdemir's parents separated when she was two years old, she lived with her grandparents in Ankara for three years.

Career
Özdemir began her acting career in 2012, she starred in the series Sakarya Fırat and depicted the character of Melike Derbent, which was broadcast on TRT 1. In the same year, she made her debut in the series Araf Zamanı and İstanbul Hatırısı and portrayed the character of Sultan. In 2014, she made her debut in the series Kara Para Aşk and portrayed the character of Nilüfer Denzer. In 2015,  she made her debut in the series Analar ve Anneler and portrayed the character of Sevgi. The same year she portrayed the character of Rosa in the movie Tabula Rosa. In 2016, she starred in the movie Biz Size Döneriz and portrayed the character of Defne. The same year, she was starred in the series İçerde. In 2017, she appeared in the movie Dünyanın En Güzel Kokusu 2. In the same year, she starred in Kırlangıç Fırtınası and Meryem and which she depicted the character of Beliz, which was broadcast on Kanal D.

In 2018, she portrayed the character of Fulya in the movie Baba Nerdesin Kayboldum. In the same year, she had a main role in the series Ege'nin Hamsisi and portrayed the character of Zeynep Gerginoğlu. In 2019, she appeared in the series Güvercin and portrayed the character of İpek, which was broadcast on Star TV. In 2020, she made her debut in the series Akrep and depicted the character of Selma.

Personal life
Özdemir dated Turkish actor Can Yaman, however they broke up. In 2019, she started dating lawyer Nail Gönenli, they attended the concert of Oğuzhan Koç.

Filmography

Film

Television

Music videos

References

External links
 
 

Living people
1992 births
Turkish television actresses
21st-century Turkish actresses
Turkish film actresses
Actresses from Istanbul
Istanbul Technical University alumni